Karmravor (meaning "reddish" because of the color of its dome), also known as the Church of Holy Mother of God (Սուրբ Աստվածածին, Surb Astvatsatsin) is a 7th-century Armenian Apostolic church in the town of Ashtarak in the Aragatsotn Province.

Architecture
Surp Astvatsatsin is a small building with a cruciform central-plan and a dome with an octagonal drum and a Byzantine-style red tile roof. It measures only 19 feet 7 inches by 24 feet 6 inches, and is simply decorated with geometric and foliage patterns around the eaves and cornices. The apse is horseshoe shaped. Many of the original tiles on the roof which were laid on mortar have remained intact, and the church has had only some minor restoration during the 1950s.

According to Thierry, Surp Astvatsatsin marks a turning point in Armenian architecture, with its plan in the shape of a cross with a single dome setting a style that would be repeated over the centuries in spite of other influences. Other churches of a similar style attributed to the 6th or 7th century are St. Marine of Artik, Lmbatavank, St. Astvatsatsin of Talin, and St. Astvatsatsin of Voskepar.

The door of the church was created and carved in 1983 by Sargis Poghosyan.

In the cemetery adjoining the church is the grave of the poet Gevorg Emin.

Gallery

References

Notes

Bibliography

External links
 About Karmravor Church
 Armeniapedia.org: Karmravor Church

Tourist attractions in Aragatsotn Province
Armenian Apostolic churches in Ashtarak
Oriental Orthodox congregations established in the 7th century